Andrzej Edward Jasionowski (born 29 November 1964, in Łódź) is a Polish civil servant and diplomat; ambassador to Serbia (2009–2014) and Croatia (since 2018).

Life 
Jasionowski, following his studies at the University of Łódź, graduated in 1991 from the Faculty of Law and Administration, University of Warsaw, specializing in international public law. 

From 1986 to 1989 he was chairman of the Independent Students’ Association (NZS) of the University of Łódź, president of the Alliance of Independent Students’ Associations of Łódź’s higher schools, and member of the NZS’s National Coordinating Committee.

After 1990, he was working for the Ministry of Transportation and Marine Economy and Office for State Protection. In 1992, he joined the Ministry of Foreign Affairs of Poland. Between 1992 and 1994, he was posted at the embassy in Lagos as deputy commercial counsellor. From 1995, he was consul in Almaty. In 1997, he was posted to Stockholm as consul. From 2000, he was at the MFA’s Department of Polish Diaspora. That year, for a couple of months, he was seconded to Oslo. In 2002, he became head of the Consular Department at the embassy in Helsinki. From 2006 to 2008, he was Director of the Department of Consular Affairs and Polish Diaspora. Between 14 October 2009 and 2014, he served as an Ambassador to Serbia. Later, he was Deputy Director, and Director of the Department of Consular Affairs. From August 2016 to 2017 he was holding post of the Director General of Foreign Service. Since January 2018 he represents Poland as ambassador to Croatia.

Besides Polish, Jasionowski speaks English, Russian, and Croatian. In his youth, he trained archery.

Honours 

 Cross of Freedom and Solidarity, 2017

References 

1964 births
University of Warsaw alumni
Ambassadors of Poland to Croatia
Ambassadors of Poland to Serbia
Living people
Diplomats from Łódź
Polish dissidents
Recipients of Cross of Freedom and Solidarity